The 1938 United States House of Representatives elections was an election for the United States House of Representatives were elections for the United States House of Representatives to elect members to serve in the 76th United States Congress. They were held for the most part on November 8, 1938, while Maine held theirs on September 12. They occurred in the middle of President Franklin D. Roosevelt's second term. Roosevelt's Democratic Party lost a net of 72 seats to the Republican Party, who also picked up seats from minor Progressive and Farmer–Labor Parties.

Multiple factors contributed to the Democratic decline. One main reason was the Recession of 1937. Unemployment soared, undercutting the Democrats' claim that the New Deal had ended the Great Depression. Democrats fought among themselves, especially over Roosevelt's "Court Packing" plan. In addition, there was backlash against Roosevelt's intervention in the Democratic primaries which angered conservative Democrats. The labor unions, which were emerging as a powerful grassroots factor in the New Deal Coalition, split bitterly as the American Federation of Labor and Congress of Industrial Organizations fought over membership.

Internal Democratic strains were exacerbated by an effort led by Roosevelt to purge certain conservative senators for defeat in Democratic primaries, including Walter George of Georgia, Millard Tydings of Maryland and Ellison Smith of South Carolina, along with the chairman of the House Rules Committee, John J. O'Connor of New York. All but the last were re-elected.

While a number of New Deal supporters won primary elections, such as Sen. Alben Barkley in Kentucky, who defeated Happy Chandler, in Idaho, Sen. James P. Pope, a prominent New Deal supporter, lost his bid for re-nomination, as did California senator William McAdoo. The many seats Democrats won in traditionally Republican districts in the 1930, 1932, 1934 and 1936 elections meant that they had to defend a large number of marginal seats.

Meanwhile, the Republicans were united; they had shed their weakest members in a series of defeats since 1930. Re-energized Republicans focused attention on strong fresh candidates in major states, especially Robert A. Taft, the conservative from Ohio, Earl Warren, the moderate who won both the Republican and the Democratic primaries in California, and Thomas Dewey, the crusading prosecutor from New York. The Republican resurgence in 1938 was made possible by carrying 50% of the vote outside the South, giving GOP leaders confidence it had a strong base for the 1940 presidential election.

Effects

Overall, the Democrats lost 72 seats in the House, though with 262 seats, they retained a majority. The defeats were nearly all in the North, as the South resumed its historic role as the Democratic base in Congress. The Republicans gained 81 seats and none of their incumbents lost reelection.

President Franklin D. Roosevelt had faced opposition from conservative Democrats and the Republicans in Congress since the beginning of his presidency. Representatives Edward E. Cox, Howard W. Smith, and other Southern Democrats opposed Roosevelt's policies with the Republicans, but were in the minority. Vice President John Nance Garner pushed for Roosevelt to support more conservative policies. However, after the election the Democratic majority was maintained, but around forty Democratic representatives were unreliable votes for Roosevelt which allowed conservatives to block his policies.

Overall results

Source: Election Statistics - Office of the Clerk

Special elections 

|-
! 
| Fred M. Vinson
| 
| 1930
|  | Incumbent resigned May 27, 1938 to become justice of the U.S. Court of Appeals for the District of Columbia Circuit.New member elected June 4, 1938.Democratic hold.
| nowrap | 

|-
! 
| J. Lister Hill
| 
| 1923 
|  | Incumbent resigned January 11, 1938 when appointed U.S. senator.New member elected June 14, 1938.Democratic hold.
| nowrap | 

|-
! 
| Allard H. Gasque
| 
| 1922
|  | Incumbent died June 17, 1938.New member elected September 13, 1938.Democratic hold.
| nowrap | 

|-
! 
| Frank L. Kloeb
| 
| 1932
|  | Incumbent resigned August 19, 1937 when appointed judge of the U.S. District Court for the Northern District of Ohio.New member elected November 8, 1938.Republican gain.
| nowrap | 

|}

Alabama

Arizona

Arkansas

California

Colorado

Connecticut

Delaware

Florida

Georgia

Idaho

Illinois

Indiana

Iowa

Kansas

Kentucky

Louisiana

Maine

Maryland

Massachusetts

Michigan

Minnesota

Mississippi

Missouri

Montana

Nebraska

Nevada

New Hampshire

New Jersey

New Mexico

New York

North Carolina

North Dakota

Ohio

Oklahoma

Oregon

Pennsylvania

Rhode Island

South Carolina

South Dakota

Tennessee

Texas

Utah

Vermont

Virginia

Washington

West Virginia

Wisconsin

Wyoming

Non-voting delegates

Alaska Territory 

Alaska Territory elected its non-voting delegate September 13, 1938.

See also
 1938 United States elections
 1938 United States Senate elections
 75th United States Congress
 76th United States Congress

Notes

References

Further reading
 Carson, Jamie L. "Electoral and Partisan Forces in the Roosevelt Era: The US Congressional Elections of 1938." Congress & the Presidency 28#2 (2001) 161–183 https://doi.org/10.1080/07343460109507751
  
 
 
  (Excerpt and text search); also in JSTOR